Taijijian is a straight two-edged sword used in the training of the Chinese martial art Taijiquan. The straight sword, sometimes with a tassel and sometimes not, is used for upper body conditioning and martial training in traditional Taijiquan schools. The different family schools have various warmups, forms and fencing drills for training with the jian.

Historical use of jian in Taijiquan 

The Yang and Wu families were involved in Qing dynasty military officer training, and taught jian technique to their students. Traditional Taijijian forms are rooted in martial application, and are thus originally designed to make use of the weapons available at the time of their development.  As there was no historical jian type created specifically for taijiquan, the forms were designed around the use of a functional jian of the day, being of appropriate weight, balance, sharpness and resilience to be effective in armed combat.

Modern Wushu 
A lighter version of the traditional sword and theatrical versions of traditional sword forms are also used in the "taijiquan" routines of wushu curriculum. The wushu sword is a narrow, double-edged Chinese jian with a thin blade designed to make noise when it is shaken by the competitor during competition and a tassel is always attached to the pommel. The jian variants used for taijijian wushu display or as training tools in modern-day martial arts schools often have properties that render them unsuitable for historically accurate combat.  These properties, such as extreme blade thinness or a high degree of flexibility compared to historical battlefield quality jian, are intended to add auditory and visual appeal to a wushu performance.

32 forms
Taijijian 32 sword forms (32式 太極劍)
1. Point Sword with Feet Together (并步点剑) - Beginning(起势)
2. Stand on One Leg and Thrust (独立反刺)
3. Sweep Sword in Crouch (仆步横掃)
4. Carry Sword to the Right (向右平带)
5. Carry Sword to the Left (向左平带)
6. Stand on One Leg and Cut with Armswing (独立掄劈)
7. Step Back and Withdraw Sword (退步回抽)
8. Stand on One Leg and Thrust (独立上刺)
9. Plunge Sword Downward in Empty Stance (虚步下截)
10. Thrust in Left Bow Stance (左弓步刺)
11. Turn Round and Carry Sword (转身斜带)
12. Retreat and Carry Sword (缩身斜带)
13. Lift Knee and Hold Sword with Both Hands (提膝捧剑)
14. Hop and Thrust (跳步平刺)
15. Swing Up Sword in Left Empty Stance (左虚步撩)
16. Swing Up Sword in Right Bow Stance (右弓步撩)
17. Turn Round and Withdraw Sword (转身回抽)
18. Thrust with Feet Together (并步平刺)
19. Parry in Left Bow Stance (左弓步攔)
20. Parry in Right Bow Stance (右弓步攔)
21. Parry in Left Bow Stance (左弓步攔)
22. Step Forward and Plunge Backward (弓步反刺）
23. Turn Round to Cut (反身回劈)
24. Point Sword in Right Empty Stance (虚步点剑)
25. Stand on One Leg and Hold Sword Level (独立平托)
26. Cut in Bow Stance (弓步挂劈 )
27. Cut with Armswing in Empty Stance (虚步掄劈)
28. Step Back to Strike (撤步反擊)
29. Step Forward to Thrust (进步平刺)
30. Withdraw Sword in T-Step (丁步回抽)
31. Circle Sword Horizontally (旋转平抹)
32. Thrust Forward in Bow Stance (弓步直刺) - Closing Form(收势)

See also
 Jian
 Taijiquan
 Dao (sword)
 Qiang (spear)

References

External links

  Ma Yueliang Wu style 108 Taijijian form YouTube video

Tai chi
Chinese swords
Chinese martial arts
Chinese melee weapons
Weapons of China
Chinese swordsmanship